Son Dong-woon (born June 6, 1991), known mononymously as Dongwoon, is a South Korean singer. He is a member of the boy group Highlight (formerly known as Beast).

Biography
Son Dong-woon was born in Busan, South Korea, on June 6, 1991. His father, Son Il-rak, is a professor at Cheongju University. Dong Woon stated in an interview and in the KBS show Win Win that he studied in Santa Rosa, Laguna, Philippines. Dong Woon was a trainee from JYP Entertainment for two years, and was the last member chosen to join Beast. He is the youngest of the group.

Dong Woon attended Hanyoung High School and graduated from Dongguk University on 16 February 2017.

On May 9, 2019, Son began his mandatory military service as a conscripted policeman. He was discharged on December 8, 2020.

Career

Beast/Highlight 

The group has released eight Korean mini-albums and various singles. Dong Woon is a vocalist of Highlight.

Solo career 
In December 2010, Son released a digital single album Udon together with Davichi's Kang Min Kyung. However, it is said by the composers of 'Udon' that the title of the song is in Japanese, hence the main three broadcasting networks confirmed that they would not be showing on television.

In April 2012, Son released "In the Cloud" for Shinsadong Tiger's 'Supermarket_another Half'.

On May 22, 2015, Cube Entertainment revealed that Son will release his first solo album Kimishika on July 1 before officially beginning his Japanese debut promotions.

On February 2, 2017, Son released Universe, a digital single album in collaboration with composer Yoo Jae-hwan.

On July 18, 2018, Son released his first digital single album, Prelude: Voice.

On April 22, 2019, Son released his first mini album, Act 1: The Orchestra.

On June 6, 2022, Son released his second mini album, Happy Birthday.

In 2022, Son appears in the SBS drama Today's Webtoon, marking his terrestrial television debut.

Discography

Extended plays

Soundtrack appearances and solo performances

Songwriting credits

Filmography

Television series

Web series

Television shows

Web shows

Hosting

Theatre

References

External links

Highlight (band) members
1991 births
K-pop singers
Living people
Cube Entertainment artists
South Korean male singers
South Korean pop singers
South Korean male idols
South Korean dance musicians
People from Santa Rosa, Laguna
People from Busan
South Korean male dancers
Konkuk University alumni
Japanese-language singers of South Korea
Tagalog-language singers of South Korea